The 2009 Copa Mustang was the 62nd season of Colombia's top-flight football league, the Categoría Primera A. The season is divided into two championships; Torneo Apertura and Torneo Finalización. Each tournament crowned a national champion and qualified for the 2010 Copa Libertadores.

Teams

Torneo Apertura
The Torneo Apertura began on February 6 and ended on June 28. Once Caldas won the tournament for their 3rd national title.

First stage

Standings

Results

Cuadrangular semifinals
The second stage of the Torneo Apertura was a quadrangular semifinal. The eight teams qualified from the first stage were placed into two groups of four. The top-two seeded teams were placed into separate groups, while the other qualified teams were pooled into odd and even seeds and placed into separate groups. Each group played against each other in a double round-robin format. The top team from each group will play each other in the finals.

Group A

Group B

Finals
First leg

Second leg

Top-five goalscorers

Torneo Finalización
The Torneo Finalización began on June 10 and ended December 20.

First stage

Standings

Cuadrangular semifinals
The second stage of the 2009 Copa Mustang II is a quadrangular semifinal. The eight teams qualified teams from the first stage were placed into two groups of four. The top-two seeded teams were placed into separate groups, while the other qualified teams were pooled into odd and even seeds and placed into separate groups. Each group played against each other in a double round-robin format. The top team from each group will play each other in the finals.

Group A

Group B

Finals
First leg

Second leg

Top-five goalscorers

Relegation
Relegation was determined by an average of the points obtained in the First Stages of the past six tournaments (three seasons). For the purposes of completing the relegation table, the 2007 and 2008 numbers of the 2008 Primera B champion (Real Cartagena) will be the same as the team that finished 16th in this relegation table.

Updated as of games played on November 15, 2009.Source:

Relegation/promotion playoff
By finishing 17th in the relegation table, Deportivo Pereira played a playoff against the 2009 Primera B runner-up Atlético Bucaramanga. The team that accumulated the most points over two legs will play in the Primera A for the 2010 season. If there is a tie in points, goal difference would be taken into account, followed by a penalty shootout. Atlético Bucaramanga host the first leg.

Aggregate table
The aggregate table is the sum of all points and results throughout the entire season, including Cuadrangulares and Finals. This table determined the remaining berths for the Copa Libertadores and Copa Sudamericana

See also
Categoría Primera A
2009 Copa Colombia

References

External links
Copa Mustang Official Page
Dimayor Official Page

Categoría Primera A seasons
Col
1